Rokometno društvo Ribnica or simply RD Ribnica is a team handball club from Ribnica, Slovenia. They play in the Slovenian First League of Handball. The club is currently known as RD Riko Ribnica due to sponsorship reasons.

European record 
All results (home and away) list Ribnica's goal tally first.

External links
Official website 

Handball clubs established in 1956
Slovenian handball clubs
1956 establishments in Slovenia
Municipality of Ribnica